In mathematics, the q-Racah polynomials  are a family of basic hypergeometric orthogonal polynomials in the basic Askey scheme, introduced by .  give a detailed list of their properties.

Definition

The  polynomials are given in terms of basic hypergeometric functions and the Pochhammer symbol by 

They are sometimes given with changes of variables as

Relation to other polynomials
q-Racah polynomials→Racah polynomials

References

Orthogonal polynomials
Q-analogs
Special hypergeometric functions